The 1927 Navy Midshipmen football team represented the United States Naval Academy during the 1927 college football season. In their second season under head coach Bill Ingram, the Midshipmen compiled a 6–3 record, shut out two opponents, and outscored all opponents by a combined score of 192 to 84.

The annual Army–Navy Game was played on November 26 at the Polo Grounds in New York City; Army

Schedule

References

Navy
Navy Midshipmen football seasons
Navy Midshipmen football